This is a list of mayors of Laurel, Maryland, a city in the central part of the U.S. state of Maryland. Before the city's (nonpartisan) office of Mayor was established, a similar role was that of President of the Board of Commissioners. Officials elected to multiple consecutive terms have the number of terms noted after their names. The term length changed from one year to two years in 1904, and from two years to four years in 1974.


Presidents of the Laurel Board of Commissioners

Mayors of Laurel

References 

People from Laurel, Maryland
Laurel